Balinți may refer to:

 Balinți, a village in Iarova Commune, Moldova
 Balinți, a village in Havârna Commune, Romania